Kali Quzi (also Romanized as Kalī Qūzī; also known as Golī Qūzī, Kolī, and Kollī) is a village in Yeylaq Rural District, in the Central District of Kaleybar County, East Azerbaijan Province, Iran. At the 2006 census, its population was 394, in 85 families.

References 

Populated places in Kaleybar County